Mastigograptidae is an extinct family of graptolites.

Genera
List of genera from Maletz (2014):

†Mastigograptus Ruedemann, 1908
†Micrograptus Eisenack, 1974

References

Graptolites
Prehistoric hemichordate families